Colla may refer to:

People 
 Colla people, indigenous people of Argentina, Bolivia, and Chile

Given name 
 Colla mac Báirid (died 932), King of Limerick
 Colla MacDonnell (died 1558), Scottish noble
 Colla mac Fergusso (died 786), possible King of Connacht
 Colla Swart (born 1930), South African photographer
 The Three Collas, legendary fourth-century High Kings of Ireland

Surname 
 Ángel Colla (born 1973), Argentine racing cyclist
 Claudia Colla (died 1611), alleged Italian witch and royal mistress
 Connie Colla, American news anchor
 Daniel Colla (born 1964), Argentine volleyball player 
 Domenico Colla (fl. 1760s), Italian musician, toured Europe with his brother
 Elliott Colla, American academic
 Enrique Colla, Argentine footballer
 John von Collas (1678–1753), Baroque architect
 Johnny Colla (born 1952), American musician
 Luigi Aloysius Colla (1766–1848), Italian botanist
 Nicholas Colla (born 1986), Australian actor
 Richard A. Colla (born 1936), American film director and actor

Places 
 Colla (Thrace), a settlement of ancient Thrace, now in Turkey
 Colla, Bordj Bou Arreridj, Algeria
 Colla Kingdom, an Andean civilization
 La Collá, a parish of Siero, Asturias, Spain
 Val Colla, a valley in Switzerland
 Valcolla, a municipality in the canton of Ticino, Switzerland

Other uses 
 Colla (moth), a moth genus

Feminine given names
Scottish feminine given names